The Germania Musical Society (1848–1854) was an orchestra that performed in the United States in the mid-19th century. Its musicians emigrated from Germany after a successful tour of England. Carl Lenschow and Carl Bergmann served as directors. The group toured throughout the country. Concerts took place in the Melodeon and the Music Hall, Boston; Brinley Hall and City Hall, Worcester, Massachusetts; Astor Opera House, New York City; Metropolitan Hall, New York City; Ocean Hall, Newport, Rhode Island; Westminster Hall, Providence; and elsewhere.

The group met with particular success in Boston, where they performed Mendelssohn's "Overture" to A Midsummer Night's Dream 39 times at 22 concerts, and spent the summer in Newport, Rhode Island. In 1852 they settled in Boston and remained for three years before disbanding. They performed regularly in the oratorio performances of the Handel and Haydn Society, which gave Boston's first performance of Beethoven's Ninth Symphony with the Germania Orchestra under the baton of the Germania's conductor Carl Bergmann on April 2, 1853. A reviewer in the Journal of Music wrote: "It was the unanimous feeling that the 'Germanians' covered themselves with glory upon the occasion."

By one account:

Band members, who had become U.S. citizens, settled in Baltimore, Boston, New York, Philadelphia, Syracuse and Chicago.

References

Further reading
 
 Nancy Newman, Good Music for a Free People: The Germania Musical Society in Nineteenth-Century America, NY: University of Rochester Press, 2010 

American classical music groups
1850s in the United States
1848 establishments in the United States
1854 disestablishments in the United States
Musical groups established in 1848
Musical groups disestablished in 1854